Per Martin Sunde (born 23 February 1944) is a Norwegian alpine skier. He was born in Oslo. He participated at the 1964 Winter Olympics in Innsbruck, where he competed in slalom and giant slalom.

He was Norwegian champion in slalom in 1961 and in 1964.

References

External links

1944 births
Living people
Alpine skiers from Oslo
Norwegian male alpine skiers
Olympic alpine skiers of Norway
Alpine skiers at the 1964 Winter Olympics